White Slave Ship is a 1961 film directed by Silvio Amadio and starring Pier Angeli and Edmund Purdom. Titled  L'ammutinamento on its original Italian release, it was released in the United States in 1962.

Plot
Set in 1675, the film was about a group of convicts being transported from London to the New World as white slaves aboard the ship Albatross, captained by Isaac Cooper (Ivan Desny). Among the convicts held in chains below decks are Doctor Robert Bradley, a political prisoner being transported to the American colonies for treating a wounded rebel (Purdom); Polly, a prostitute (Pier Angeli) and a murderer, Calico Jack (Armand Mestral). Above decks and living in comparative luxury are an upper class English family, the Medford's, including their beautiful daughter Anna (Michele Girardon). Halfway across the Atlantic; the prisoners escape and take over the ship. Robert Bradley saves Anna's life and, despite their very different stations in life, the two gradually fall in love.

Cast
Pier Angeli as Polly 
Edmund Purdom as Dr. Robert Bradley 
Armand Mestral as Calico Jack 
Ivan Desny as Captain Isaac Cooper 
Michèle Girardon as Anna Medford
Mirko Ellis as Lord Graveston
Lee Madden as Doctor Who

Production
White Slave Ship, a 1961 French-Italian co-production in TotalScope and Eastman Color, was purchased by American International Pictures in 1962, who dubbed the film into English and replaced the original music score by Angelo Lavagnino with one by Les Baxter. AIP released it in ColorScope and Pathe Color.

References

External links

1961 films
English-language Italian films
Films directed by Silvio Amadio
Seafaring films
Films set in the 1670s
Cultural depictions of Calico Jack
1960s English-language films
1960s Italian films